Matthew Jacob Hong (born September 4, 1991) is an American rock climber, filmmaker and photographer. As a filmmaker, he directed the 2017 film Break on Through, which documented Margo Hayes completing the first female ascent of a 5.15-rated route,  featured on the Reel Rock Film Tour.

Biography
Hong was born in Boulder, Colorado in 1991. He began climbing at an early age, brought to climbing spots in Rifle Canyon as a baby by his father Steve Hong and mother Karin Budding, who were both pioneering rock climbers. He joined a climbing team in middle school and began climbing more seriously at age 15, when he climbed his first  and  routes in Rifle.

In 2011, Hong recorded the first ascent of Bad Girls Club in Rifle and in 2015, he bolted and completed his first route, La Cucaracha in Wicked Cave, also in Rifle.

After earning a Bachelor of Fine Arts in Film Production at the University of Colorado Boulder, Hong climbed his first  route, Papichulo  in Oliana, Spain, in March 2016.

In May 2018, he climbed the  Fight or Flight in Oliana, Spain, becoming the fourth American to climb the grade after Chris Sharma, Ethan Pringle and Daniel Woods.

In October 2021, Hong completed the second ever ascent of Flex Luthor, first sent by Tommy Caldwell in 2003.

Hong competed at IFSC Climbing World Youth Championships in 2009 and 2010 in the Male Youth Junior (age 17–19) category. He has also competed in the senior climbing circuit, making the final at the 2011 IFSC Lead World Cup event in Boulder, finishing sixth.

Notable ascents

Onsight

Logical Progression, El Gigante, Mexico

Mind Control, Oliana, Catalunya

Redpoint

Fight or Flight, Oliana, Spain, 2018
Flex Luthor, Fortress of Solitude, Colorado, 2021

La Rambla, Siurana, Spain, 2017
Papichulo, Oliana, Spain, 2017
Joe Mama, Oliana, Spain, 2017

First ascent

Bad Girls Club, Rifle, Colorado, 2011
 Planet Garbage (5.14d), Rifle, Colorado, 2014
 Stocking Stuffer (5.14d), Rifle, Colorado, 2017

La Cucaracha, Rifle, Colorado, 2015
Apple Juice Flood, Red River Gorge, Kentucky, 2016
Sweet Tooth, Red River Gorge, Kentucky, 2016

Boulders

Warrior Up, Lincoln Lake, Colorado, 2012
 Dreamtime, Ticino, Switzerland, 2020

Competition
Sixth Place
2011 IFSC Lead World Cup, Boulder CO

Filmography
 Break on Through (2017), director, featured on Reel Rock 12

References

External links
 
 The North Face profile
 UKclimbing.com profile
Matty Hong's profile on theCrag

American rock climbers
Sportspeople from Boulder, Colorado
1991 births
American documentary film directors
Photographers from Colorado
Living people